Michail Elgin and Alexandre Kudryavtsev were the defending champions, but they didn't compete together.
Kudryavtsev chose to play with Evgeny Kirillov, but they lost to Uladzimir Ignatik and Konstantin Kravchuk in the quarterfinal.
Elgin partnered up with Nikolaus Moser, and together won the championship by defeating Alexander Bury and Kiryl Harbatsiuk 6–4, 6–4.

Seeds

Draw

Draw

References
 Doubles Draw
 Qualifying Draw

Penza Cup - Doubles
Penza Cup
2010 in Russian tennis